Mihály Fülöp (10 April 1936 – 26 September 2006) was a Hungarian foil fencer. He won a bronze medal in the team foil event at the 1956 Summer Olympics.

References

External links
 

1936 births
2006 deaths
Hungarian male foil fencers
Olympic fencers of Hungary
Fencers at the 1956 Summer Olympics
Fencers at the 1960 Summer Olympics
Olympic bronze medalists for Hungary
Olympic medalists in fencing
Fencers from Budapest
Medalists at the 1956 Summer Olympics